{{Infobox sports team
| name = Team Secret
| logo = Team Secret logo.svg
| logo_size = 
| alt = 
| caption = 
| location = Europe
| parent_group = 
| founded = 
| folded = 
| manager = CyborgmattJohn Yao
| coach = Lee "Heen" Seung-gon
| partners = Corsair GamingMetaThreadsNVIDIASecretlab
| sport = esports
| games = Dota 2Rainbow Six SiegePUBG MobileLeague of LegendsLeague of Legends: Wild RiftVALORANTRocket LeagueMobile Legends (Soon)
| website = http://teamsecret.gg/
| footnotes = 
| fanclub = 
}}
Team Secret is an esports team based in Europe formed in 2014, best known for their Dota 2 team.

In March 2016, Team Secret picked up an international female Counter-Strike: Global Offensive team. In April 2016, Team Secret expanded into the world of Street Fighter with Lee "Poongko" Chung-Gon as their first World Warrior, and also signed Otto "Silent Wolf" Bisno as a Super Smash Bros. Melee player. In July 2018 Team Secret entered into competitive Age of Empires 2 after acquiring key members from Team TyRanT.
In August 2018, Team Secret expanded into Rainbow Six Siege'' Pro League by signing Team IDK.

Dota 2

History

2014 
N0tail and Fly were confirmed to leave Fnatic on July 27, 2014. On August 3, 2014, s4 left Alliance. Some rumors of a new all-star team began to rise on Reddit.

Na`Vi posted on their website they released Puppey and KuroKy. On August 27, 2014, Team Secret debuted and showed their roster in a match against Alliance.

2015 
After a solid second place in Star-Ladder Series 10, the team announced on their Twitter and the DAC site of the departure of Fly and BigDaddy, with zai and Arteezy taking their place as stand-ins.

Team Secret got third place in the Dota 2 Asia Championships and decided to stick with their roster, going on to win 5 premier tournaments.

Team Secret was widely considered to be the favorites to win The International 2015, but after a very disappointing 7-8th-place finish, the team announced that they would have some roster changes. Despite the overall success of the team for the year, members Arteezy and KuroKy were revealed to have clashed with one another and both players left the team. Arteezy went back to his previous team Evil Geniuses and KuroKy formed what would soon be the newest iteration of Team Liquid. On August 15, the team announced that Zai would take the next year off and finish school. As a result, s4 also decided to leave and rejoin his previous team Alliance.

For the Frankfurt Major, the team's new roster was announced and consisted of EternalEnVy, w33, Misery, Puppey, and pieliedie.

2016 
During the Shanghai Major, Team Secret went through the upper bracket beating previous Frankfurt Major winners: OG in a best of three of 2–1 in the first upper bracket round; they faced Evil Geniuses in the second upper bracket round and won 2–1. Team Secret then faced Team Liquid in the upper bracket finals in a best of 3, winning 2-0 and heading into the Major's Grand Final.

On March 6, Team Secret played against the recent lower bracket winners Team Liquid in the Grand Finals in a best of five match for US$1.1 million. Team Secret won the match with a 3–1 score.

On March 22, Team Secret announced that Artour "Arteezy" Babaev and Saahil "Universe" Arora would be replacing w33 and MiSeRy.

On June 6, after placing last at the Manila Major, Team Secret announced that Kanishka "BuLba" Sosale would be replacing Saahil "UNiVeRsE" Arora.

On August 27, the team announced a completely new roster, featuring Asian players Pyo "MP" No-a, Yeik "MidOne" Nai Zheng and Lee "Forev" Sang-don in addition to the already established European support duo Johan "pieliedie" Åström and Clement "Puppey" Ivanov.

On November 6, Forev's departure was announced. His replacement for the season would be German offlaner Maurice "KheZu" Gutmann.

2017 
After achieving no major tournament victories by May 2017, notably knocked out in the first round of the Kiev Major by tournament underdogs SG-esports, Team Secret replaced pieliedie with Yazied "YapzOr" Jaradat, moving Puppey to the 5 position. While their results were somewhat improved, it did not make up for a lackluster season, leading to Team Secret not being directly invited to The International 2017. After making it through the European qualifiers, Team Secret was knocked out of The International 2017 by eventual champion Team Liquid in a tense 2–1 series, finishing in 9th-12th place. During the following roster shuffle, KheZu and MP were replaced by Marcus "Ace" Hoelgaard and Adrian "FATA-" Trinks in September 2017. With the new roster and new season of Dota Pro Circuit 2017-2018, they went on to win DreamLeague Season 8.

2018 
Despite the team achieved several minor tournament victories, they did not win any major tournament in 2018, placing 5th-6th in The International 2018. With the new season of Dota Pro Circuit 2018-2019, the team underwent another roster shuffle, with Ace and Fata leaving the team, replacing them would be Michał "Nisha" Jankowski and Ludwig "zai" Wåhlberg.

2019 
At the KL Major, Team Secret were hailed as one of the favorites. After topping their group easily, the team went on to tear through the Upper Bracket, only dropping one game to Virtus.pro in the Upper Bracket Finals. Unfortunately for Secret, VP took their revenge in the Grand Finals in a nail-biting five-game series, where Secret were able to take a 2–1 lead but were unable to secure a final victory to take home the Major Championship.

With the shuffle, the team achieved a couple major tournament wins, notably The Chongqing Major and the MDL Disneyland Paris Major. Team Secret had 14,400 points in the ranking of the professional season Dota 2 from Valve and occupy the very first place in it with Puppey being voted as the MDL MVP.
They played 8 games on the last day MDL Disneyland Paris Major winning through the upper bracket and coming to win the finals in style. Zai was a major factor in making space with his Mars for Nisha and MidOne. Nisha had the most last hits at 35 min in the tournament. Team Secret would go on to win the finals in a very convincing manner with a results of 3–1 over Team Liquid.

Roster

Rainbow Six Siege

History 
Shortly before the Six Major Paris 2018, Team Secret signed Team IDK. The original roster consisted of Bryan "Elemzje" Tebessi, Ryan "Lacky" Stapley, Leon "LeonGids" Giddens, Matthew "meepeY" Sharples, David "sTiZze" de Castro and Louis "Helbee" Bureau as coach. At the Paris Major, Team Secret placed 3-4th after besting OrgLess, FaZe Clan, Team Vitality, and losing to G2 Esports, the eventual champions and received $25,000.

On February 17, 2020, Joonas "jNSzki" Savolainen came out of retirement after leaving G2 and later the Mousesports/GiFu roster to replace Elemzje.

On May 5, the team disbanded

On May 13, Team Secret signed Team OrgLess after they qualified for the European League, ahead of their debut.

Roster

League of Legends

History

Roster

PUBG Mobile

History 
Team Secret recruited a Malaysian Team Genexsus who won their respective PMCO Malaysia Finals before going to Shanghai for PMCO SEA League. The team advanced to PMCO SEA Grand Finals in Jakarta and won 4th place which qualified them for the preliminaries Round for PMCO Global Finals in Berlin in July 2019, where they finished in the 11th place out of 15 teams that joined. They were also the first Malaysian team to represent Malaysia in the global tournament. In June 2020, Team Secret recruited 3 new players as well as a coach for their team: Madtoi, uHigh, and Rex, and their new coach, Jangs.

In 2021, Team secret added Fredo and Jumper after Bigetron Esports bought JangS and uHigh. To fill uHigh's spot, Team Secret also decided to bought Xash from Gbe. Rex also moved from Team Secret and joined Resurgence Malaysia.

Roster

League of Legends: Wild Rift

History

Roster

Valorant

History

Roster

Rocket League

History 
On February 25 Team Secret acquired the roster of Erased; Roberto Lima "Sad" de Souza, Matheus "math" Gonçalves, Olímpio "nxghtt" Torres. September 19 math was removed from the starting lineup. October 8th Danilo "kv1" Michelini joined.

Roster

References

External links 

Dota teams
Super Smash Bros. player sponsors
Fighting game player sponsors
Esports teams established in 2014
Vainglory (video game) teams
Tom Clancy's Rainbow Six Siege teams
League of Legends: Wild Rift teams